Lucas Edward Nix (born September 28, 1989) is a former American football offensive guard. He played college football at Pittsburgh.

Professional career

2012 NFL Draft

Oakland Raiders
He was signed by Oakland Raiders as undrafted free agent on May 4, 2012. The Raiders waived Nix on August 26, 2014.

Chicago Bears
On August 24, 2015, Nix signed a one-year contract with the Chicago Bears. On September 1, 2015, he was waived by the Bears.

References

External links
Oakland Raiders bio 
Pittsburgh Panthers bio 

1989 births
Living people
American football offensive guards
Pittsburgh Panthers football players
Oakland Raiders players
Chicago Bears players
Players of American football from Pennsylvania
People from Clairton, Pennsylvania